St. Gregory Episcopal School was established in 1962 by the Rev. R. L. Whitehouse and Gordon L. Baker. Its founders envisioned a liturgical and educational institution patterned after the all-male English Cathedral choir schools, but situated within the urban context of Chicago. Founded as an outreach ministry of the Episcopal Church of the Epiphany, the school shared space within the church and its parish hall until August 2002. Enrollment was necessarily small (under 30) given the limited amount of space.

In August 2002 St. Gregory's moved to the former Blessed Sacrament School building in Chicago's North Lawndale community. With the additional space at its new location, it realized a long term desire to add a kindergarten class. There was also room for a computer lab, a library, a lunchroom and a small parking lot that doubles as a playground.

On June 30, 2010 it merged with Holy Family School and Ministries in the North Lawndale Homan Square neighborhood.

References

External links
St. Gregory Episcopal School Website

Private schools in Chicago
Episcopal schools in the United States